The knockout phase of the 2013–14 UEFA Europa League began on 20 February and concluded on 14 May 2014 with the final at Juventus Stadium in Turin, Italy. A total of 32 teams competed in the knockout phase.

Times up to 29 March 2014 (round of 16) were CET (UTC+1), thereafter (quarter-finals and beyond) times were CEST (UTC+2).

Round and draw dates
All draws were held at UEFA headquarters in Nyon, Switzerland.

Matches may also be played on Tuesdays or Wednesdays instead of the regular Thursdays due to scheduling conflicts.

Format
The knockout phase involved 32 teams: the 24 teams which qualified as winners and runners-up of each of the twelve groups in the group stage, and the eight third-placed teams from the Champions League group stage.

Each tie in the knockout phase, apart from the final, was played over two legs, with each team playing one leg at home. The team that scored more goals on aggregate over the two legs advanced to the next round. If the aggregate score was level, the away goals rule was applied, i.e., the team that scored more goals away from home over the two legs advanced. If away goals were also equal, then thirty minutes of extra time was played. The away goals rule was again applied after extra time, i.e., if there were goals scored during extra time and the aggregate score was still level, the visiting team advanced by virtue of more away goals scored. If no goals were scored during extra time, the tie was decided by penalty shoot-out. In the final, which was played as a single match, if scores were level at the end of normal time, extra time was played, followed by penalty shoot-out if scores remained tied.

The mechanism of the draws for each round was as follows:
In the draw for the round of 32, the twelve group winners and the four third-placed teams from the Champions League group stage with the better group records were seeded, and the twelve group runners-up and the other four third-placed teams from the Champions League group stage were unseeded. The seeded teams were drawn against the unseeded teams, with the seeded teams hosting the second leg. Teams from the same group or the same association could not be drawn against each other.
In the draws for the round of 16 onwards, there were no seedings, and teams from the same group or the same association could be drawn against each other.

Qualified teams

Europa League group stage winners and runners-up

Champions League group stage third-placed teams

Bracket

Round of 32
The draw was held on 16 December 2013. The first legs were played on 20 February, and the second legs were played on 27 February 2014.

|}

First leg

Notes

Second leg

Real Betis won 3–1 on aggregate.

Napoli won 3–1 on aggregate.

Sevilla won 4–3 on aggregate.

Viktoria Plzeň won 3–2 on aggregate.

Ludogorets Razgrad won 4–3 on aggregate.

Red Bull Salzburg won 6–1 on aggregate.

Basel won 3–0 on aggregate.

5–5 on aggregate. Porto won on away goals.

Tottenham Hotspur won 3–2 on aggregate.

Juventus won 4–0 on aggregate.

Lyon won 1–0 on aggregate.

Fiorentina won 4–2 on aggregate.

Anzhi Makhachkala won 2–0 on aggregate.

Valencia won 2–0 on aggregate.

Benfica won 4–0 on aggregate.

AZ won 2–1 on aggregate.

Notes

Round of 16
The draw was held on 16 December 2013. The first legs were played on 13 March, and the second legs were played on 20 March 2014.

|}

First leg

Notes

Second leg

AZ won 1–0 on aggregate.

Valencia won 4–0 on aggregate.

Lyon won 5–3 on aggregate.

Benfica won 5–3 on aggregate.

Juventus won 2–1 on aggregate.

Porto won 3–2 on aggregate.

2–2 on aggregate. Sevilla won 4–3 on penalties.

Basel won 2–1 on aggregate.

Notes

Quarter-finals
The draw was held on 21 March 2014. The first legs were played on 3 April, and the second legs were played on 10 April 2014.

|}

First leg

Notes

Second leg

Benfica won 3–0 on aggregate.

Juventus won 3–1 on aggregate.

Valencia won 5–3 on aggregate.

Sevilla won 4–2 on aggregate.

Semi-finals
The draw was held on 11 April 2014. The first legs were played on 24 April, and the second legs were played on 1 May 2014.

|}

First leg

Second leg

3–3 on aggregate. Sevilla won on away goals.

Benfica won 2–1 on aggregate.

Final

References

External links
2013–14 UEFA Europa League

3
UEFA Europa League knockout phases